Dongfeng Nengdi (Hangzhou) Motor Co., Ltd. also known as just DND is a Chinese manufacturer of fire trucks.

History

The company was known as Dongfeng Nissan Diesel Motor Co., Ltd., which was a joint venture between the Dongfeng Motor Group and UD Trucks (now part of Isuzu) established in 1996. They held 50% of its shares respectively.

The company was later renamed to Dongvo (Hangzhou) Truck Co., Ltd. in 2013, and in 2017 to Dongfeng Nengdi (Hangzhou) Motor Co., Ltd..

Plants

Products
 KuTeng, based on UD Quester

References

External links
 

Manufacturing companies based in Hangzhou
Fire service vehicle manufacturers
Truck manufacturers of China
Dongfeng Motor